Sidet: Forced Exile is a 1991 film directed and produced by Salem Mekuria.

Plot
Three women who are refugees try to survive despite the challenges that each individual faces in their journey of life.

References

Ethiopian drama films
1991 films